Dūkštos Eldership is an eldership in Lithuania, located in Vilnius District Municipality, east of Vilnius.

Geography and nature 
The eldership is home to Neris Regional Park.

Neris Regional Park also incorporates Bražuolė Botanical Reserve and Vepriai Botanical Reserve, which have many rare and endangered plant species and forests common to southern Lithuania.

Also within the nature reserve is the Dūkštai oak grove with Oak of Dūkštai.

History 
Dūkštos were mentioned in historical sources since the 14th century, when Teutonic knights frequently raided Kernavė, and its people used to retreat to Dūkštos.

In 1743, Dūkštos became property of a Piarist monastery. By 1790, there was a working parish school, later reformed into a Piarist college.

After the failed November Uprising of 1830-1831, Piarists were forced to leave Dūkštos. The village was very supportive of the January Uprising of 1863, and a revolutionary commander headquarters were established in the nearby forests, while a nearby valley served as the location of a military hospital for revolutionaries and people injured during clashes with the Tsarist authorities. In 1868, by an order of the governor of Vilnius, the local church was closed, later converted to an orthodox church, and only returned to Catholics by the end of the 20th century.

Populated places 
There are 49 villages in the eldership, the largest of which are Brinkiškės, Dūkštos, Geisiškės, Verkšionys and Miežionys.

Notable locations 

 Stone of Bradeliškės - a protected boulder with undeciphered runic script, located within Dūkštai oak grove.
 Karmazinai Mound
 Tumuli compound near Karmazinai village
 Bradeliškės Hillfort 
 Bradeliškės water mill

Ethnic composition 
According to the 2011 census:

 Polish - 53.9%
 Lithuanian - 30.1%
 Russian - 11.6%

Gallery

References 

Elderships in Vilnius District Municipality